Linda French (born March 4, 1964) is an American badminton player. She competed in women's singles and women's doubles at the 1992 Summer Olympics in Barcelona. She also competed at the 1996 Summer Olympics.

Achievements

PanAm Championships

Women's doubles

References

External links

1964 births
Living people
American female badminton players
Olympic badminton players of the United States
Badminton players at the 1992 Summer Olympics
Badminton players at the 1996 Summer Olympics
People from Elmhurst, Illinois
Pan American Games medalists in badminton
Pan American Games bronze medalists for the United States
Badminton players at the 1995 Pan American Games
Medalists at the 1995 Pan American Games
21st-century American women